Joseph Joseph Lafata (August 3, 1921 – May 6, 2004) was a first baseman and outfielder in Major League Baseball. He played for the New York Giants.

References

External links

1921 births
2004 deaths
Major League Baseball first basemen
Major League Baseball outfielders
New York Giants (NL) players
Baseball players from Detroit